Melanella eburnea is a species of sea snail, a marine gastropod mollusk in the family Eulimidae. The species is one of a number within the genus Melanella.

Distribution

This species occurs in the following locations:

 New Jersey, USA to São Paulo, Brazil

References

External links
 To World Register of Marine Species

eburnea
Gastropods described in 1824